Trustco Bank Namibia limited, formerly the FIDES Bank Namibia, is a commercial bank in Namibia owned by . Its main commercial activity is to provide microfinancing services.

History

The bank was built after a pilot project called . This project developed microfinance activities from 2002 to 2010, targeting specifically rural population seeking to develop income generation activities.
This project initially started in Ohangwena Region and moved to Ondangwa in 2005,  Oshakati in 2006 and Outapi in 2007.

Upon creation of the bank, then operating as FIDES Bank Namibia, the portfolio of loan was transferred to the new institution, which developed from then on an MSME portfolio as well.

The bank received its provisional banking license on 4 August 2009. and its permanent license on 1 February 2010.

Activity

The institution has its headquarters located in Ongwediva in Oshana Region (North-Central part of Namibia). It was one of five commercial banks in 2009 licensed to operate in the country by the Bank of Namibia (the national banking regulator) and the first microfinance bank created in the country since independence.

Trustco Bank Namibia is active in two banking segments:
 income generation activities financing (microfinance): this activity aims at proposing savings and loans products to a clientele mainly located in rural areas of the country. The development of this activity is based on a group methodology and deals with populations almost exclusively excluded from the formal Namibian banking system.
 Micro, small and medium-size enterprises financing: this activity targets semi-formalized and formalized businesses, usually not approached by traditional banks.
At the end of 2012, FIDES Bank Namibia had a client base of approximately  people and little above  microfinance groups, borrowing on average 216 euros.

Geographical Presence and Branch Network
, FIDES Bank Namibia is present in the four 'O' regions of Northern-Central Namibia (Ohangwena, Omusati, Oshana and Oshikoto). It has a network of 4 branches located in Ondangwa, Oshakati, Oshikango and Outapi. The first branch was opened in Oshakati in April 2010. A new branch is about to open in the Khomas region, in Katutura.

Ownership
FIDES Bank Namibia was owned at the time of its inception by four shareholders:
 Swiss Microfinance Holding (30.05%);
 German Development Bank KfW (24.90%);
  from France (22.45%); and
 the Belgium-based fund  NV (12.60%);
 the French cooperative bank Crédit Coopératif (10.00% - since late 2011).

In 2014 the bank was acquired by Trustco Group Holdings and renamed to Trustco Bank Namibia, Ltd.

See also

 Bank of Namibia
 Economy of Namibia
 List of banks in Namibia
 Microcredit

References

External links

Banks of Namibia
Companies of Namibia
Banks established in 2010
Microfinance
Namibian companies established in 2010